A night owl, evening person or simply owl, is a person who tends to stay up until late at night, or to the very early hours of the morning. Night owls who are involuntarily unable to fall asleep for several hours after a normal time may have delayed sleep phase disorder.

The opposite of a night owl is an early bird – a lark as opposed to an owl – which is someone who tends to begin sleeping at a time that is considered early and also wakes early.  Researchers traditionally use the terms morningness and eveningness for the two chronotypes or diurnality and nocturnality in animal behavior. In several countries, especially in Scandinavia, one who stays up late is called a B-person, in contrast to an early riser being called an A-person.

History
While staying up after dark was considered a negative trait, this changed in 17th and 18th century Europe (and subsequently spread beyond) due to the development and implementation of artificial lighting: more domestic lights, added street lighting, and adaptation by the royal and upper social classes. The introduction of chocolate, coffee and tea, and cafes that stayed open through dawn, became part of the new culture.

Etymology

The term is derived from nocturnal habits of owls. Most owls sleep during the day and hunt for food at night.

Characteristics

Usually, people who are night owls stay awake past midnight, and extreme night owls may stay awake until just before or even after dawn. 

Some night owls have a preference or habit for staying up late, or stay up to work the night shift. Night owls who work the day shift often have difficulties adapting to standard daytime working hours.

Night owls have often been blamed for unpunctuality or attitude problems. Employers, however, have begun to learn to increase productivity by respecting body clocks through flexible working hours, while the Danish "B-Society" of night owls and the American Start School Later movement lobby actively for more school and workplace flexibility for the post-agricultural world.

Some research has found that night owls are more intelligent and creative and more likely to get high-paying jobs than larks, or morning persons. A study among 1000 adolescents by the University of Madrid found that night owls scored higher than early birds on inductive reasoning tests, which often serve as a proxy for intelligence. However, they lag behind larks in academic performance, and they tend to have unhealthier eating habits, as well as higher rates of smoking.

Some night owls with great difficulty adopting normal sleeping and waking times may have Delayed sleep phase disorder. Morning light therapy may be helpful in shifting sleep rhythms for the night owl.

Psychology 
The night-owl pattern is more prevalent in men than in women. Night-owls are more likely to be single than in long-term relationships.

Factors 
The tendency to be a night owl exists on a spectrum, with most people being typical, some people having a small or moderate tendency to be a night owl, and a few having an extreme tendency to be a night owl.  An individual's own tendency can change over time and is influenced by multiple factors, including:
 a genetic predisposition, which can cause the tendency to run in families,
 the person's age, with teenagers and young adults tending to be night owls more than young children or elderly people, and
 the environment the person lives in, except for the patterns of light they are exposed to through seasonal changes as well as through lifestyle (such as spending the day indoors and using electric lights in the evening).

The genetic make-up of the circadian timing system underpins the difference between early and late chronotypes, or early birds and night owls.   While it has been suggested that circadian rhythms may change over time, including dramatic changes that turn a morning lark to a night owl or vice versa, evidence for familial patterns of early or late waking would seem to contradict this, and individual changes are likely on a smaller scale.

Prevalence
A 2007 survey of over 55,000 people found that chronotypes tend to follow a normal distribution, with extreme morning and evening types on the far ends.

Career options 
Night owls tend to thrive in careers that do not require working in the early morning. People who want to work in the evening are often employed at restaurants, hotels, entertainment venues, retail stores, and some personal care businesses. Night owls who work the night shift may work in emergency services, in transportation, or at round-the-clock facilities, such as hospitals and some manufacturing plants.

Many businesses that operate in the evening or at night need employees at all levels, from entry-level employees to managers to skilled staff, whenever they are open.  For example, most hospitals employ many types of workers around the clock:
 non-medical staff such as security guards, IT specialists, cleaning and maintenance workers, cooks and food service staff, and admissions clerks;
 medical staff such as nurses, paramedics, radiographers, pharmacists, and phlebotomists;
 managers for each of the main hospital wards or activities, including janitorial supervisors and head nurses.

Industries that tend to be less favorable to night owls include farming, construction, education, and working for public utilities.  Many employees in these industries start working before 7:00 a.m.

Notable people

A list of famous night owls includes:

 Charles Bukowski
 Fidel Castro
 Michael Chabon
 Winston Churchill
 Bob Dylan
 Gustave Flaubert
 Glenn Gould
 Samuel Johnson
 Carl Jung
 Franz Kafka
 Fran Lebowitz
 H. P. Lovecraft
 Marilyn Manson
 E. T. A. Hoffmann
 Mao Zedong
 Frank Meyer
 Barack Obama
 Prince
 Marcel Proust
 George Sand
 Joseph Stalin
 Hunter S. Thompson
 J. R. R. Tolkien
 Henri de Toulouse-Lautrec
 John Travolta
 Linus Torvalds
 Frank Zappa
 Van Cliburn

In popular culture
 In Pliny the Elder's Natural History, he states Vita vigila est, "to be alive is to be watchful", a military metaphor for keeping watch in the night.
 For Robert Louis Stevenson, "There is a romance about all those who are abroad in the black hours."
 In Jayne Ann Krentz's Truth or Dare, "Arcadia and Harry were both creatures of the night. They managed to appear oddly stylish at one-thirty in the morning."
 British author Hilary Rubinstein wrote: "Blessed are the owls, for they shall inherit the mystery and magic of the night."
 In the Little River Band song "The Night Owls": "Be strong, find the heart of a night owl falling/Stay up till dawn until the night is gone"

See also
 Chronobiology – the study of sleep cycles and other time-dependent biological systems
 Circadian rhythm sleep disorder
 Insomnia – the inability to fall asleep or stay asleep
 Morningness–eveningness questionnaire (MEQ)
 Munich Chronotype Questionnaire (MCTQ)
 Nightlife – activities, mostly entertainment-oriented, done between sundown and sunrise
 Zeitgeber – environmental factors, such as bright light, that reinforce sleep–wake cycles

References

Further reading
Louise Miller, Careers for Night Owls and Other Insomniacs (2002)
J. Dunlap et al., Chronobiology (2004)

External links
 Sleep Discrimination
 Intelligence and Creativity in Night Owls vs. Early Birds with several references to different studies
 Sleep deprivation impacts night owls and early risers differently

Sleep
Circadian rhythm
Night
Owls in culture